Patrick Kristensen (born 28 April 1987 in Silkeborg) is a Danish retired footballer.

Career
Kristensen got the honour of scoring AaB's goal number 1000 in the Superliga, on 25 October 2009 in a match against Brøndby IF.

On 22 July 2020, 33-year old Kristensen announced his retirement. Kristensen played 367 official games for AaB during his career.

Honours

Club
AaB
Danish Superliga (2): 2007–08, 2013–14
Danish Cup (1): 2013–14

References

External links

AaB profile 
National team profile
Career statistics at Danmarks Radio

1987 births
Living people
Danish men's footballers
Denmark under-21 international footballers
AaB Fodbold players
Danish Superliga players
Association football wingers
Association football forwards
People from Silkeborg
Sportspeople from the Central Denmark Region